Three. Two. One. is the debut studio album by Canadian singer-songwriter Lennon Stella. The album was released on April 24, 2020 by Columbia Records. Stella collaborated with various producers during the making of Three. Two. One. including Malay and previous collaborators Joel Little and Sam de Jong. Five tracks were issued as singles: "Kissing Other People", "Golf on TV" (featuring JP Saxe), "Jealous", "Fear of Being Alone", and "Older Than I Am". The album follows Stella's debut EP Love, Me, released on November 16, 2018.

Background
In an interview with Apple Music, Stella describes Three. Two. One. as "releasing myself from the pressure of prior expectations and intimidations. Three, two, one, I’m diving in and doing what feels good to myself. The album is a free fall. Ultimately, I wanted [this album] to be an honest introduction, true to who I am as a human being, and hopefully people will draw parallels to their own lives. The track "Save Us" features an interpolation of British singer Donna Lewis's 1996 hit "I Love You Always Forever". The song "Jealous" features songwriting credits from Finneas. Three. Two. One. is a pop album.

Critical reception

Three. Two. One. received positive reviews from critics. In a review from The Observer, critic Kitty Empire calls Three. Two. One. "strikingly serene." In a review from Exclaim!, Ariel Matheson praises Stella with a score of 8/10, calling the album a "feminine powerhouse."

Track listing
Credits adapted from the liner notes of Three. Two. One.

Notes
  signifies co-producer
  signifies vocal producer
  signifies additional producer

Sample credits
 "Save Us" contains elements of "I Love You Always Forever" (1996) performed by Donna Lewis.

Charts

References

2020 debut albums
Columbia Records albums
Albums produced by Joel Little
Albums produced by Sam de Jong
Lennon Stella albums